Unison is the first album of Japanese composer Shin Terai, released in 1999. The album features contributions of bassist and producer Bill Laswell, avant-garde guitarists Buckethead (who would join Guns N' Roses soon after the recording sessions) and Nicky Skopelitis, and Parliament-Funkadelic keyboardist Bernie Worrell. The album met very good reviews from critics mainly because of the soft guitars and the funky bass.

Track listing

Personnel

 Bass, Synthesizer, Effects - Bill Laswell
 Engineers - Oz Fritz & Robert Musso
 Guitar - Buckethead
 Guitar, Sitar - Nicky Skopelitis
 Organ, Synthesizer, Clavinet - Bernie Worrell
 Voice, Synthesizer, Loops, Beats, Effects - Shin Terai
 Programming, Loops - Robert Musso
 Written by - Bill Laswell (tracks: 2 to 7), Shin Terai
 Producer - Bill Laswell, Shin Terai
 Mixed by - Bill Laswell
 Mastered by - Michael Fossenkemper

References

External links

2001 debut albums
Albums produced by Bill Laswell
Shin Terai albums